EMJC may refer to:
 East Meadow Jewish Center, a Conservative synagogue in East Meadow, New York
 East Midwood Jewish Center, a Conservative synagogue in Midwood, Brooklyn, New York